Ghostbusters: Original Soundtrack Album is the soundtrack album for the 1984 film of the same name, released by Arista Records on June 8, 1984. The soundtrack includes the Billboard Hot 100 number one hit "Ghostbusters", written and performed by Ray Parker Jr. The film score, Ghostbusters: Original Motion Picture Score, is composed by Elmer Bernstein. The film score remained unreleased until March 16, 2006, released by Varèse Sarabande.

Ghostbusters: Original Soundtrack Album

Development 
Early on, Ghostbusters director Ivan Reitman and Elmer Bernstein discussed the idea that the film would feature popular music at specific points to complement Bernstein's original score. This included "Magic" by Mick Smiley, which plays during the scene when the ghosts are released from the Ghostbusters headquarters. Bernstein's main theme for the Ghostbusters was later replaced by Ray Parker Jr.'s "Ghostbusters". Bernstein personally disliked the use of these songs, particularly "Magic", but said, "it's very hard to argue with something like ["Ghostbusters"], when it is up in the top ten on the charts". The soundtrack also includes two tracks from Elmer Bernstein's score for the film.

Music was required for a montage in the middle of the film, and "I Want a New Drug" by Huey Lewis and the News was used as a temporary placeholder because of its appropriate tempo. Reitman was later introduced to Parker Jr. who developed "Ghostbusters" with a similar riff to match the montage. There were approximately 50 to 60 different theme songs developed for Ghostbusters by different artists before Parker Jr.'s involvement, though none was deemed suitable. Huey Lewis was approached to compose the film's theme, but was already committed to work on Back to the Futures soundtrack.

Track listing

Charts

Certifications

Ghostbusters: Original Motion Picture Score

Development 
The Ghostbusters score was composed by Elmer Bernstein and performed by the 72-person Hollywood Studio Symphony orchestra at The Village in West Los Angeles, California. It was orchestrated by Bernstein's son, Peter and David Spear. Bernstein had previously scored several of Ivan Reitman's films and was hired before filming had begun or all the cast had been signed. Reitman wanted a grounded, realistic score and did not want the music to tell the audience when something was funny. Bernstein used the ondes Martenot (effectively a keyboard equivalent of a theremin) to produce the "eerie" effect. Bernstein had to bring a musician, Cynthia Millar, from England to play the instrument because there were so few trained ondists. He also used three Yamaha DX7 synthesizers.

In a 1985 interview Bernstein described Ghostbusters as the most difficult score he had written, finding it challenging to balance the film's varying comedic and serious tones. He created an "antic" theme for the Ghostbusters he described as "cute, without being really way out". He found the latter parts of the film easier to score, aiming to make it sound "awesome and mystical".

Track listing

See also 
Ghostbusters II (soundtrack)
Ghostbusters (2016 soundtrack)
Ghostbusters: Afterlife (soundtrack)

References 

Ghostbusters music
1984 soundtrack albums
Arista Records soundtracks
Sony Classical Records soundtracks
Comedy film soundtracks